Golden Down is the second studio album by the American rock artist Willie Nile, released in 1981 on vinyl by Arista Records and re-released in 1992 on CD by Razor & Tie.

Track listing

Personnel
Musicians
 Willie Nile – vocals, guitar and piano
 Clay Barnes – guitars
 Peter Hoffman  – guitars
 Fred Smith – bass guitar
 Jay Dee Daugherty – Sonor drums and percussion
 Paul Shaffer – keyboards on "Les Champs Élysées", "Shine Your Light", "Golden Down", "Hide Your Love", "I Like The Way" and "Poor Boy" 
 Greg Husted – Hammond organ on "Shoulders", and "Poor Boy”
 Paul Prestopino  – dulcimer and dobro on "I Like The Way”
 Arno Hecht – saxophone on "Les Champs Élysées”
 Terre Roche – backing vocals
 Mark Johnson – backing vocals
 Lowry Hamner – backing vocals

Production and additional personnel
 Produced by Thom Panunzio and Willie Nile
 Additional production: Jimmy Iovine – "Poor Boy”
 Engineered by Thom Panunzio 
 Additional engineering by Jim Ball – "It’s Your Love”
 Assistant sngineer: Jim Ball, Jason Corasro
 Mastering by Greg Calbi at Sterling Sound, NYC
 Art direction by Maude Gilman
 Reissue art direction by Kristian Lawing
 Cover Photography Christine Rodin
 Additional photography: Irene Young, Marcelino Pagan, Kristian Lawing

Charts

References

1981 albums
Willie Nile albums
Albums produced by Thom Panunzio
Albums recorded at Record Plant (New York City)
Arista Records albums